Herochroma subviridaria is a moth of the family Geometridae first described by Yazaki in 1994. It is found in Asia.

References

Moths described in 1994
Pseudoterpnini
Moths of Asia